A by-election was held for the New South Wales Legislative Assembly electorate of Paddington on 24 May 1919 because of the resignation of John Osborne who had accepted an appointment to the Metropolitan Meat Industry Board. The board was responsible for the control and maintenance of abattoirs, cattle sale yards, meat markets, and slaughterhouses in the greater Sydney region. H. V. Evatt described the appointment as intended to deprive Labor of one of its better political organisers ahead of the 1920 election.

Dates

Result

The by-election was caused by the resignation of John Osborne who had accepted an appointment to the Metropolitan Meat Industry Board.

Aftermath
Lawrence O'Hara's service would be brief, dying just  days later on 14 June 1919 as a result of the influenza pandemic. The resulting by-election was held on 26 July 1919.

See also
Electoral results for the district of Paddington
List of New South Wales state by-elections

Notes

References

1919 elections in Australia
New South Wales state by-elections
1910s in New South Wales